Robert Patrick Milbert (born June 21, 1949) is an American politician in the state of Minnesota. He served in the Minnesota House of Representatives.

References

Democratic Party members of the Minnesota House of Representatives
People from Dakota County, Minnesota
Dartmouth College alumni
1949 births
Living people